Blancco Technology Group is a global provider of mobile device diagnostics and secure data erasure products. The company is divided into two distinct business units: Blancco (data erasure) and SmartChk (mobile diagnostics).

Company Profile 
Originally known as Regenersis plc (LSE: RGS), Blancco Technology Group plc (LSE: BLTG) was formed in 2016 as the result of a number of software business acquisitions. Following the acquisitions, Regenersis disposed of its repair division to focus on being a pure-play software business and renamed itself as Blancco Technology Group plc.

The company is divided into two distinct business units: Blancco (data erasure) and SmartChk (mobile diagnostics). Blancco Technology Group employs 240 people worldwide across North America, Europe, Asia and Australia. The company is headquartered in Alpharetta, GA, United States.

History 
Blancco Technology Group started as Regenersis plc, a provider of diagnostics, repair and data erasure services to the consumer electronics industry. Regenersis filed for IPO in 2005 as a public company on the London Stock Exchange. In the same year, it acquired Intec Group (Intec Cellular Services and Intec Distribution).

Partnerships 
Blancco Technology Group partners with multiple resellers and distributors, including IT asset disposition vendors, mobile services and recycling providers, data centers and cloud storage providers.

References

External links 
 Official website

Data erasure
Mobile device management
Mobile device management software